Francesc Llenas (born ) is a retired Spanish male volleyball player. He was part of the Spain men's national volleyball team at the 2010 FIVB Volleyball Men's World Championship in Italy. He played for Narbonne (FRA).

Clubs
 Narbonne (FRA) (2010)

References

1982 births
Living people
Spanish men's volleyball players
Place of birth missing (living people)
Spanish expatriate sportspeople in France